Eupithecia mirificata is a moth in the family Geometridae. It is found in Afghanistan, Tajikistan and Iran.

References

Moths described in 1938
mirificata
Moths of Asia